This is a list of results of National Football League games played on Turner Network Television (TNT). From 1990–1997, TNT broadcast NFL games on Sunday nights for the first half of the regular season (or nine games a year). Meanwhile, ESPN would pick things up for the second half of the season.

Following the 1997 season, ESPN would broadcast Sunday night NFL games for the whole season.  This particular arrangement between ESPN and the National Football League would continue until the end of the 2005 season.  Since that time, NBC (who last broadcast NFL games the same year that TNT last broadcast them, 1997) has been the television home of Sunday night games.  Meanwhile, ESPN replaced ABC as the broadcaster of Monday night games in 2006.

The Phoenix/Arizona Cardinals were the only team to appear on TNT every year of the run, as they had their home opener (and one additional game in 1994) aired on the network each year.

Note: The winning teams' names are in bold.

1990

1991

1992

1993

1994

1995

1996

1997

References

External links
NFL & Pro Football League Encyclopedia | Pro-Football-References.com
1997
1996
1995
1994
1993
1992
1991
1990

Sunday Night Football results (1990-1997)
National Football League on television results
Sunday Night Football